Jinja District is a district in the Eastern Region of Uganda. The town of Jinja is the district's main municipal and commercial center.

Location
Jinja District is bordered by Kamuli District to the north, Luuka District to the east, Mayuge District to the south-east, Buvuma District to the south, Buikwe District to the west, and Kayunga District to the north-west.

Population
In 1991, the national population census estimated the district population at 289,500. The 2002  national census estimated the population at 387,600, with an annual population growth rate of 2.7 percent. In 2012, the population was estimated at 501,300.

See also
Districts of Uganda

References

External links 
 Jinja District Information Portal

 
Busoga
Districts of Uganda
Eastern Region, Uganda
White Nile
21st-century Ugandan politicians